MIDletPascal is a Pascal compiler and IDE specifically designed to create software for mobiles. It generates Java bytecode that runs on any Java ME device. In September 2009, Niksa Orlic, who wrote MIDletPascal, transmitted the source code to the Russian Boolean.name development community for feature development. MIDletPascal is now open-source, and hosted at SourceForge.

On 2 February 2013, MIDletPascal 3.5 Final released.

Features

 generates low-level, small and fast Java bytecode
 full Pascal specification support
 parts of code can be written directly in Java
 SMS messaging
 HTTP connectivity
 user-interface (forms) support
 multimedia support
 user-friendly IDE

Hello World
Because it runs on mobiles that don't have a console, the Hello world program of MIDletPascal is quite different from a normal Pascal "Hello World".

 program HelloWorld;
 begin
   DrawText ('Hello, World!', 0, 0);
   Repaint;
   Delay(2000);
 end.

See also
 Midlet

References

Free integrated development environments
Pascal (programming language) compilers
Pascal programming language family